The 55th Primetime Emmy Awards were held on Sunday, September 21, 2003. The ceremony was broadcast on Fox. The Sci Fi channel received its first major nomination this year for Outstanding Miniseries for Taken; the series won the award.

With the win for Outstanding Lead Actress in a Comedy Series for Debra Messing, Will & Grace became only the third television show to have all credited actors win a Primetime Emmy Award for their respective role, following All in the Family and The Golden Girls (also later tied by The Simpsons). For its seventh season, Everybody Loves Raymond won its first Primetime Emmy Award for Outstanding Comedy Series. It led all comedies with four major wins and ten major nominations. The West Wing won Outstanding Drama Series for the fourth consecutive year, tying the record set by Hill Street Blues (also later tied by Game of Thrones and Mad Men).

Despite failing to win Outstanding Drama Series, The Sopranos continued to rake in the awards, leading all dramas with four major wins, including James Gandolfini and Edie Falco winning their third and final trophy for their respective category. Also Joe Pantoliano's win for Supporting Actor in a Drama marked the first time HBO had won in this category.

Additionally, for the first time, not only did the Lead Male in a Comedy award go to a show outside the Big Four TV networks, with Tony Shalhoub's win, for Monk on the USA Network, it was that network's first ever Acting win.

For the first time since 1991, the Outstanding Drama Series field did not include Law & Order; it was nominated 11 times in the category, a record for drama series that still stands. The mark tied the overall record held by comedy series M*A*S*H and Cheers. For the first time since its premiere, Frasier, then in its tenth and penultimate season, didn't win a major award, with its only major nominations going to David Hyde Pierce and John Mahoney for Outstanding Supporting Actor in a Comedy Series. The ceremony featured 11 presenters, which included: Ellen DeGeneres, Brad Garrett, Darrell Hammond, George Lopez, Conan O'Brien, Bernie Mac, Dennis Miller, Garry Shandling (who opened the show with a comedic monologue), Martin Short, Jon Stewart, and Wanda Sykes.

Winners and nominees
Winners are listed first and highlighted in bold:

Programs

Acting

Lead performances

Supporting performances

Directing

Writing

Most major nominations
By network 
 HBO – 53
 NBC – 38
 CBS – 28

By program
 Everybody Loves Raymond (CBS) / Six Feet Under (HBO) / The Sopranos (HBO) / The West Wing (NBC) - 10
 Curb Your Enthusiasm (HBO) / Will & Grace (NBC) – 7
 Door to Door (TNT) / Sex and the City (HBO) – 6

Most major awards
By network 
 HBO – 8
 CBS – 8
 NBC – 6
 TNT – 4
 Comedy Central – 2

By program
 Door to Door (TNT) / Everybody Loves Raymond (CBS) / The Sopranos (HBO) – 4

In Memoriam

Roone Arledge
David Bloom
Ben Brady
David Brinkley
Charles Bronson
Nell Carter
Johnny Cash
James Coburn
Jeff Corey
Richard Crenna
Hume Cronyn
Buddy Ebsen
Buddy Hackett
Katharine Hepburn
Gregory Hines
Bob Hope*
Michael Jeter
Bob Keene
Bruce Paltrow
Gregory Peck
Peg Phillips
John Ritter
Fred Rogers
Edgar Scherick
Jack Smight
Robert Stack
Mike Stokey
Lynne Thigpen

Notes

References

External links
 Emmys.com list of 2003 Nominees & Winners
 

055
2003 television awards
2003 in Los Angeles
September 2003 events in the United States